Brahma Temple may refer to:
 Brahma Temple (Grand Canyon), a summit in the Grand Canyon, USA
 Brahma Temple, Khajuraho, a temple in Madhya Pradesh, India
 Brahma Temple, Bindusagar, a temple in Odisha, India
 Brahma Temple, Niali, a temple in Odisha, India
 Brahma Temple, Pushkar, a temple in Rajasthan, India
 Brahma Temple, Prambanan, a temple in Central Java, Indonesia
Chhinch is a Town in Banswara District, Rajasthan, India. It is one of the rarest towns in India, where Lord Brahma's temple (12th Century) is situated.(priyansh_b)
 Brahma Temple, Bramha Karmali, a temple in Goa, India

See also
 :Category:Brahma temples